The 2017–18 season was the season of competitive football (soccer) in Senegal.

Diary of the season
November 25: the 2017–18 Ligue 1 begins
December 9:
Mbour Petite Côte defeated Guédiawaye 2-4 and became the two highest scoring matches of Ligue 1 for the season
Stade Mbour defeated Teungueth 4-1 and also became the two highest scoring matches of Ligue 1 for the season
December 23: Génération Foot defeated Diambars (or Djambars) 5-1 and became the highest scoring match of Ligue 1 for the season
January 28: US Ouakam played its first Ligue 1 match of the season
May: ASC Jaraaf won their 12th national championship title
May 20: Génération Foot of Sangalkam won their second and recent cup title for Senegal

See also
2017 in Senegal
2018 in Senegal

References

 
2017 in Senegalese sport
2017 in association football
2018 in Senegalese sport
2018 in association football